Erfelek is a town and district of Sinop Province in the Black Sea region of Turkey. The mayor is Mehmet Uzun (AKP).

References

External links
 District governor's official website 

Populated places in Sinop Province
Districts of Sinop Province
Erfelek district